The 2022 Patriot League women's basketball tournament was the conference postseason tournament for the Patriot League. The tournament was held March 5, 7, 10, and 13, 2022, at campus sites of the higher seeds. The winner receives the conference's automatic bid to the NCAA tournament.

Seeds 
All ten teams in the conference standings qualify for the tournament. The teams are seeded by record in conference, with a tiebreaker system to seed teams with identical conference records.

The tiebreakers used by the Patriot League are: 1) head-to-head record of teams with identical record, 2) comparison of records against individual teams in the conference starting with the top-ranked team(s) and working down, 3) NCAA NET Rankings available on day following the conclusion of Patriot League regular-season play and 4) comparison of winning percentage versus out-of-league common opponents. Boston University was given the 3 seed over Bucknell due to a head-to-head sweep.

Schedule

Bracket 

* denotes overtime period

References 

2021–22 Patriot League women's basketball season
Patriot League women's basketball tournament
Patriot League men's basketball tournament